The Poet is a Little God, by Vicente Huidobro, is a book of poems written originally in Spanish.

Synopsis 
A bilingual edition of El espejo de agua, Poemas arcticos and Ecuatorial by the Chilean poet who strove to compete with nature itself in creative imagery.

Summary 
A bilingual edition of three small books of poetry, El espejo de agua, Poemas arcticos and Ecuatorial, plus a lecture on poetry, by the famous avant-garde Chilean poet. Introduction by Gary Kern.

Editions 
Translated from Spanish by Jorge García-Gómez, with an Introduction by Gary Kern. Grand Terrace, CA: Xenos Books.   (paper), xxxii + 182 p.

Poetry anthologies
Chilean poetry collections